Emit Snake-Beings also known as Snakebeings is a British/New Zealand writer multi-media visual artist and sound artist who has also worked in kinetic art, DIY ethos, DIY technology, sculpture, Cinematography, and Video Editing. He was awarded a PhD, entitled The DiY ['Do it yourself'] Ethos: A participatory culture of material engagement in 2016 for his work linking the DIY ethic and Maker culture with contemporary theory of material agency and Material culture. Recent publications have focused on developing an idea of techno-animism and ethnographic studies of technology.

Biography

Early life
Born in the Royal Free hospital in Islington, London Emit and his sister Bella Basura were moved by their parents to the new town of Welwyn Garden City, where he grew up under the combined influences of the cold war and social engineering, which was immanent in the excessive structures of town planning. At the age of 20, after studying art and design at the University of Hertfordshire he moved to London to pursue a career in art, where he Lived and worked in the economically depressed Hackney, London between the years 1987 and 1998. During this time he encountered diverse influences, including Artist cooperative, Lo-fi music, underground film, outsider art, Cabaret Voltaire Circuit bending art collectives installations using found material, and site-specific installation art. All of which was going on in the relative obscurity of one of the poorest areas of London. In 1998 Emit moved to New Zealand, continuing to work with multi-media projects including street theatre and the organisation of a 13-piece Free improvisation orchestra called The Kaosphere orchestra. In 2006 he founded the Hamilton Underground Film Festival and created Karen Karnak, an invented multiple-use pseudonym under which multiple filmmakers could participate.

Published works

 Avoiding the (Tourist) Gaze: Pursuit of the ‘Authentic’ in the Tbilisi Edgelands. (2021)
 DiY (Do-it-Yourself) Electronics, Coin-operated Relic Boxes & Techno-animist Shrines (2021)
 The Quiet Earth: Re-functioning Socio-material Knowledge In The Crisis of Pandemic (2020)
 The Liquid Midden: A Video Ethnography of Urban Discard in Boeng Trabaek Channel, Cambodia (2020)
 Learn to Spot the Dangerous Wanderings of a Maker Mind (2020)
 DIY (do-it-yourself) Postdisciplinary Knowledge (2019)
 Animism and Artefact: The entangled Agencies of a DIY [Do-It-Yourself] Maker (2018)
 DiY (Do-it-Yourself) pedagogy: a future-less orientation to education (2018)
 Community of difference: the liminal spaces of the Bingodisiac Orchestra (2017)
 Maker Culture and DiY technologies: re-functioning as a Techno-Animist practice (2017)
 The Do-it-Yourself (DiY) craft aesthetic of The Trons − Robot garage band (2017)
 It’s on the tip of my Google: Interactive performance and the non-totalising learning environment (2017)
 The DiY ['Do it yourself'] Ethos: A participatory culture of material engagement (2016)
 Trash aesthetics and the sublime: Strategies for visualising the unrepresentable within a landscape of refuse (2015)
 DiY participatory culture: Allowing space for inefficiency, error and noise (2014)
 From ideology to algorithm: the opaque politics of the internet (2013)
 The construction of Karen Karnak: The multi-author function (2013)
 The construction of Karen Karnak: The multi-author-function (2010)
 Orchid ID

Films

The Remote Viewers (2008) examines the connection between technology, the mass media and magic. The synopsis from snakebeings website provides a clue into some of the seemingly random imagery of which the film seems comprised:
"Telepaths within the electrical hermitages around Mount Te Aroha work with the local population–
 brain washing them through the use of street speakers which transmit alchemical
 formuli to keep the population docile. The source of these broadcasts is shown to be the
 mass media operating on officially approved frequency bandwidths.
 Under the guidance of remote viewing telepaths a technological witch-doctor
 called Nana Shamanic becomes the tool of the technicians observing this psychic effect."

One of the first films made was The Shrine (1993) which began as a documentation of the creation, display and destruction of four Shrines made during a journey through Holland and Spain lasting over 6 months between 1990 and 1991. Three nomadic shrines were eventually made during this time, each dedicated to a different element, with the fourth air shrine being the film itself. The first three shrines were destroyed but the super 8mm film, which documented the process, was preserved and exhibited in a series of underground film festivals including the exploding cinema in summer 1993. The preservation of The Shrine led to the beginning of a series of coin-operated shrines, which are described below, as well as the beginning of several super 8mm films. Santa Arson (1995), filmed on super 8mm, was made with Steve Rife, a pyrotechnics artist from Saint Paul, Minnesota.

Selected filmography

 Creative Ethnography Network Series

Electrical Shrines
Between the years 1991 and 2001 Emit Snake-Beings created over 30 coin-operated electrical shrines, reflecting a combination of technology and religious deities within a polytheist system. Described as techno-animist machines the shrines were made as a series of free standing works and commissioned pieces and ranged from 4 cm X 4 cm to over 2 Meters in height.
The Shrine to Nikola Tesla, created in 1995 includes the following text:
"Nikola Tesla, the inventor of A.C. Electrickery, and early pioneer of Radio, is placed among the more traditional and pre-electronic saints who like Tesla had experienced a great flash of (electrical) light.
The selector switch allows the operator to tune the shrine to the most distant transmissions, the origin of which are in constant dispute between scientists, artists and theologists. Available now for the average person in the street to decide for themselves.
Patent # 76399873-150 Made in E8. '95" The piece was displayed in the tattooist shop 'Sacred Art' London N16 for several years- The shrine: "Tattooist´s Electrical Reliquary Spirit Box" was made in 1998 as a commissioned piece for Temple Tattu in Brighton. The tattooist shop has since moved, and the whereabouts of this shrine is uncertain. (detail pictured here on right)

References

External links
Snakebeings.co.nz

Underground culture
DIY culture
New Zealand experimental filmmakers
British experimental filmmakers
1967 births
Living people
New Zealand artists
British artists